Mediouna is a town and commune in Relizane Province, Algeria.
famous men:
Hayoute 
houcine

References

Communes of Relizane Province
Algeria
Cities in Algeria